Eugen Weimann is a West German former slalom canoeist who competed in the 1960s. He won two medals in the K-1 team event at the ICF Canoe Slalom World Championships with a gold in 1965 and a silver in 1967.

References

Possibly living people
German male canoeists
Medalists at the ICF Canoe Slalom World Championships